The 1964 United States Senate election in Wisconsin was held on November 3, 1964. Incumbent Democrat William Proxmire was narrowly re-elected to a second term in office over Republican Wilbur Renk.

Democratic primary

Candidates
Kenneth F. Klinkert
William Proxmire, incumbent Senator since 1957 (Democratic)
Arlyn F. Wollenburg

Results

After losing the primary, Klinkert entered the general election as a candidate running on a "Faith and Belief in Man" ticket.

Republican primary

Candidates
Wilbur N. Renk, candidate for Governor in 1962

Results

General election

Candidates
Wayne Leverenz (Socialist Workers)
Kenneth F. Klinkert (Faith and Belief in Man)
William Proxmire, incumbent Senator (Democratic)
Wilbur N. Renk, candidate for Governor in 1962 (Republican)

Results

See also
 1964 United States Senate elections

References

1964
Wisconsin
United States Senate